The 2016–17 Federal Hockey League season is the seventh season of the Federal Hockey League. The regular season ran from October 28, 2016 to April 2, 2017, with an unbalanced 56-game schedule between the seven teams. The Danville Dashers won their first Commissioner's Cup.

League changes
The Watertown Wolves completed renovations to their ice rink and signed a new one-year lease agreement with the city of Watertown in order to return after one season off.

In May 2016, the league expanded to St. Clair Shores, Michigan (Metro Detroit), with the new St. Clair Shores Fighting Saints, playing out of the St. Clair Shores Civic Arena.

On July 13, 2016, the "Dayton Pro Hockey" team, formerly known as the Dayton Demolition before removing references of the Demolition name in March 2016, announced it would be going dormant for the 2016–17 season. Owner Joe Pace, Sr. claimed that Hara Arena was unable to sign leases to tenants and he did not believe he could put together a team without a proper lead up time and secured arena. He also stated he would look to keep the team in Dayton in 2017 even if Hara Arena is still not available. Hara Arena would end up closing permanently in August 2016.

In June 2016, Brewster Bulldogs owner, Bruce Bennett mentioned to The News-Times that he would solely focus on his Danbury Titans team and would no longer be involved with the Bulldogs. Without finding new ownership, Bennett decided to suspend Bulldogs operations on July 14, 2016.

On September 14, the city of Cornwall, Ontario, approved a team called the Cornwall Nationals to begin play for the 2016–17 season out of the Ed Lumley Arena. On September 16, the FHL approved of the addition to the league for the upcoming season. The new team replaced the recently folded Cornwall River Kings and led by Mitch Gagne and Rodney Rivette. Midway through their first season, Rivette bought out Gagne's share of the team and Gagne left his position of general manager on 18 December. On December 21, the Nationals announced that it had secured another local investor, Will Beauvais, to help support the team, while Nationals forward, Basem Awwad, also took over general manager duties at that time.

Standings
Final standings

 Advance to playoffs

Playoffs

References

External links 
 Federal Hockey League website

FHL
Federal Prospects Hockey League seasons